Synactias is a genus of moth in the family Gelechiidae. It contains the species Synactias micranthis, which is found in Brazil.

References

Gelechiinae